The World Police Museum is a museum about policing in Guishan District, Taoyuan City, Taiwan. The museum is located inside the Central Police University.

Architecture
The floor of the museum spans over an area of 1,320 m2.

Missions
The mission of the museum is:
 To broaden research realm of police studies and to upgrade the quality of police studies
 To gain updated information of all areas for the reference of police reform in Taiwan
 To promote international academic exchange and to strengthen international police cooperation

Exhibitions
The museum has the following exhibits:
 Taiwan Police Hall
 International Police Hall

See also
 List of museums in Taiwan

References

External links
 

Law enforcement museums in Asia
Museums with year of establishment missing
History museums in Taiwan
University museums in Taiwan
Museums in Taoyuan City
Law enforcement in Taiwan